Ildico  (fl. AD 453) was the last wife of the Hunnic ruler Attila. Her name is probably Germanic, a diminutive form of the noun  ("battle"), a common element in Germanic female names (e.g. Svanhildr, Brynhildr and Gunnhildr), and Hildr ("battle") was the name of a Valkyrie. Her name is thus reconstructed as *Hildiko ("little Hildr"), and it is probably preserved in *Grímhild or *Krēmhild, the name of Ildico's later legendary version.

According to Priscus, Attila died after the feast celebrating their marriage in 453 AD, in which he suffered a severe nosebleed and choked to death in a stupor:

In Germanic heroic legends, she corresponds to Guðrún/Kriemhild, and in the Norse versions she deliberately killed Attila, in revenge for the death of her kinsmen.

References

5th-century Gothic people
5th-century women
Attila the Hun
Gothic women
Year of birth unknown